Calhan Rock Island Railroad Depot is a historic railroad station located in Calhan, Colorado, United States. The Chicago, Rock Island and Pacific Railroad provided transportation between Colorado Springs and Kansas until it went into bankruptcy in the early 1970s. The depot, built in 1906, still stands on its original site. The rails were removed and sold for scrap by 1994.

Depot station
The one story depot was built according to a common Rock Island depot plan at the time. It had a waiting room, ticket office, freight storage area and a pot belly coal stove. Station personnel were able to view trains as they entered and left the station from a bay window. Later the wood siding was covered by asbestos siding and there was likely a change in window and door placement from the original design.

Notes

References

External links

Railway stations on the National Register of Historic Places in Colorado
Colorado State Register of Historic Properties
National Register of Historic Places in El Paso County, Colorado
Railway stations in the United States opened in 1906
Former Chicago, Rock Island and Pacific Railroad stations
Transportation buildings and structures in El Paso County, Colorado
Former railway stations in Colorado
1906 establishments in Colorado